The England national cricket team toured Australia from November 1979 to February 1980 and played a three-match Test series against the Australia national cricket team. Australia won the Test series 3–0. England were captained by Mike Brearley; Australia by Greg Chappell. The Ashes were not at stake.  The first test was known for the ComBat incident, where Australian Dennis Lillee circumvented the Laws of cricket at the time by using an aluminium bat.

As part of the settlement between World Series Cricket and the Australian Cricket Board, this series was hastily arranged along with another involving Australia and the West Indies. The two Test series overlapped, with Australia alternating between playing the West Indies and England.  This format was not repeated in subsequent years when two teams toured Australia in the same season, where one series would be completed before the next began.

In addition, the teams played in a triangular Limited Overs International (LOI) tournament which also involved the West Indies cricket team. The West Indies won this tournament, defeating England in the final.

Test series summary

First Test

Second Test

Third Test

References

External links

1979 in Australian cricket
1979 in English cricket
1979–80 Australian cricket season
1980 in Australian cricket
1980 in English cricket
1979-80
International cricket competitions from 1975–76 to 1980